Coiled-coil domain containing 151 is a protein that in humans is encoded by the CCDC151 gene.

Clinical significance 

Mutations in CCDC151 are associated to Primary ciliary dyskinesia.

References

Further reading

External links